The sural nerve complex are the contributing nerves that form the sural nerve. There are eight documented anatomic variations of the sural nerve complex.

Origins
In 1987, an orthopedic surgeon named Dr. Ortiguela of the Mayo Clinic conducted a cadaveric study in which the posterior leg was exposed. She was studying the nerve fascicle contribution of each of the nerves that contribute to the final formation of the sural nerve to find better nerve donors. She originated the term sural nerve complex to fully encompass all contributions to the terminally named sural nerve (and later lateral dorsal cutaneous nerve). Further research would go on to use the sural nerve complex terminology to discuss the lateral sural cutaneous nerve, the medial sural cutaneous nerve, the sural communicating nerve and sural nerve proper.

Morphology
Recent cadaveric research shows that there are potentially six to eight variations of the sural nerve complex.

Ramakrishnan et al. reviewed 39 cadaveric studies (limbs n= 3974) and concluded that there were 6 common classifications of the contributing nerves in the origins of the sural nerve. Later cadaveric research in which 208 limbs were dissected demonstrated two variations that were unaccounted for and directly align with what previous sural nerve anatomists had uncovered in both case reports and direct research. These two variations (type 7 and 8 according to Steele et al.) demonstrate a parallel course for the medial sural cutaneous nerve and the sural nerve.

Most common formations are type 1 and 3 according to Ramakrishnan et al., Steele et al. found the same prevalence of sural nerve complex formation. The following image is of type 1-8 sural nerve formation and is a replica of what both Ramakrishan and Steele found in their work. Ramakrishnan successfully defined (types 1-6) with the largest difference being the addition of type 7 and 8 sural nerve complex by Steele. These two formations were robustly vetted due to their prevalence in the sample (in a high power study) that directly correlates with both historical and previous case literature describing formations of these SNC types.

Contributing Nerves
 Lateral sural cutaneous nerve
 Medial sural cutaneous nerve
 Sural communicating nerve

Additional images

References

External links
Referenced papers:
 Ortigeula et al SNC originating paper
 Steele et al. 208 sample cadaveric review 2021
 Ramakrishnan et al.systematic review on sural nerve formation 2015

Anatomy web references
 
 
 Cutaneous field

Nerves of the lower limb and lower torso